Assawa is a settlement in Kenya's Kisumu County. It is near the Assawa River.

History 
Before the Kenyan general election in 2013, Assawa voted as part of the Nyanza Province.

References 

Populated places in Nyanza Province